Heliophanus tenuitas is a jumping spider species in the genus Heliophanus.  It was first described by Wanda Wesołowska in 2011 in Zimbabwe.

References

Salticidae
Endemic fauna of Zimbabwe
Spiders of Africa
Spiders described in 2011
Taxa named by Wanda Wesołowska